The CVT M-200 was a two-seat glider that was designed in Italy and built in Italy and France from 1963.

Development 
Designed by Alberto and Piero Morelli, the M-200 was built by the Turin Gliding Centre (Centro di Volo a Vela – Turin) under contract with the Aero Club of Italy (Aero-club d'Italia). The M-200 is a two-seat glider with dual controls with generally similar layout to the single seat M-100 but with greater dimensions. Conventional wooden-frame structure and plywood skinning were used for the fuselage with a single-spar wing covered in plywood and fabric. Accommodation for two is provided in the staggered seat cockpit covered by a sideways hinging canopy. With relatively high performance for its day, the M-200 proved to be easy to fly both for early solo pilots and for advanced aerobatics.

The M-200 was also built in France by CARMAM as the M-200 Foehn.

Specifications (M-200)

See also

References

Notes

References
Coates, Andrew. “Jane's World Sailplanes & Motor Gliders new edition”. London, Jane's. 1980.

External links
 History of the M-200 Retrieved 8 July, 2020

Glider aircraft